Anatolanthias apiomycter is a species of reef fish found in the southeastern Pacific Ocean, along the Nazca Ridge. It is the only member of the genus Anatolanthias of the subfamily Anthiadinae, family Serranidae.

References

Anthiinae
Fish described in 1990